Andriy Mykolaiovych Kalashnikov  (born November 20, 1964) is a former Ukrainian wrestler and Olympic medalist. He received a bronze medal at the 1996 Summer Olympics in Atlanta. He trained at Sports Club Kolos Kiev.

References

External links
 

1964 births
Living people
Wrestlers at the 1996 Summer Olympics
Wrestlers at the 2000 Summer Olympics
Ukrainian male sport wrestlers
Olympic bronze medalists for Ukraine
Olympic wrestlers of Ukraine
Olympic medalists in wrestling
Sportspeople from Kyiv
Medalists at the 1996 Summer Olympics